Alfredo Sirica (born 25 April 1999) is an Italian composer, pianist and orchestrator.

Best known for his activity as soundtrack composer, he has written and produced music for cinema, video games and TV series. With his work for the Italian animated series Lampadino e Caramella nel MagiRegno degli Zampa, produced by Rai Ragazzi, he became the first composer of a soundtrack suitable also for children with disabilities such as blindness or autism, merging narration with music therapy.

Career
He writes his first soundtrack at the age of sixteen for the feature film Porches and Private Eyes, after winning an online competition promoted by Running Wild Films. 

In 2017, he is chosen by HeR Interactive and Eric Lindstrom, screenwriter for Tomb Raider, to write the soundtrack for the videogame Odyssey - The Story of Science, promoted by the scientific communicator Vsauce and currently in use in several institutes for educational purposes. During the same year, he worked on the short film Pawns by David Barbeschi, which soon becomes viral, reaching over 2 million views on YouTube and becoming part of the MUBI catalogue.

In 2018, for the feature film Sincerely, Brenda, he gets nominated for "Best Original Soundtrack" at the Detroit Filmmaker Awards. In the same year, for the Vatican Foundation, he creates the music for the animated film Bernadette. This project marks the beginning of his collaboration with the animation studio Animundi.

In 2019, together with voice actor Laura Bailey and the New York School of Visual Arts, he works on the animated short A Moonlight's Tale. The project gains immediate universal acclaim by critics and public alike, reaching over 12 million views on the web.

His collaboration with the Italian animation studio Animundi resumes. With a financial contribution from the Ministry of Cultural Heritage and Activities (Italy) and Rai Ragazzi, production for the animated series Lampadino e Caramella nel MagiRegno degli Zampa starts. It is the first TV product accessible by all children, including those affected by disabilities. The cartoon aired on 29 March 2020 on the national channel Rai Yoyo, soon becoming the most popular program watched by Italian children in the preschool age. For his work, he gets invited as a guest at the Giffoni Film Festival and several Italian television programs. At the 24th edition of the Cartoons on the Bay, the series receives the UNICEF award for "best animated series".

In 2020, with the work-in-progress animated film Bigger than Us, he wins the "Studio Alhambra Prize" at the Annecy International Animated Film Festival MIFA Pitch, obtaining significant funding for his latest soundtrack. He also writes the music for the feature film Time for Love, directed by Miguel J. Veléz, officially selected at the Cannes Film Festival Marché du Film, as well as the Austin Film Festival and the RIFF.

In 2021, he writes the soundtrack for the second season of the Italian TV series Lampadino e Caramella. In February 2022, he promotes the new episodes on the TV show I Soliti Ignoti.

Partial filmography

Cinema
Porches and Private Eyes, directed by Travis Mills (2016)
Pawns, directed by Tyrees A. Lamptey (2017)
Sincerely, Brenda, directed by Kenneth Nelson Jr. (2018)
Sinterklaas & Het Pieten Duo – Het Gestolen Speelgoed, directed by Niels Groffen (2018)
A Moonlight's Tale, directed by Aarif Attarwala (2019)
Hush, directed by Tyler Chipman (2019)
The Shade, directed by Tyler Chipman (2019)
Time for Love, directed by Miguel J. Veléz (2020)

Television
 Lampadino e Caramella nel MagiRegno degli Zampa, directed by Raffaele Bortone (2020)
 Lampadino e Caramella nel MagiRegno degli Zampa 2, directed by Raffaele Bortone and Andrea Martini (2022)
 Lampadino e Caramella nel MagiRegno degli Zampa 3, directed by Raffaele Bortone and Andrea Martini (in production)

Videogames
 Warhammer 40,000: Regicide (translator, orchestrator)
 Demetrios – The Big Cynical Adventure
 Minecraft: Story Mode (musical director)
 Odyssey – The Story of Science
 Mythic Legions Tactics (in production)
 Dark Taverns (in production)

Awards and acknowledgements 
Annecy International Animation Film Festival
 MIFA Pitch 2020 - Studios Alhambra Award for Bigger Than Us
Cartoons on the Bay
 UNICEF Award 2020 - Award for Lampadino e Caramella nel MagiRegno degli Zampa
Austin Filmmaker Awards
 Best soundtrack for a feature film - Nomination for Sincerely, Brenda

References

External links
 
 Youtube
 Youtube
 Rep
 Lampadino e Caramella: il cartoon inclusivo
 Luisa Galdo, un cartone racconta la sfida dell’inclusione
 Carried Away Now on Steam Greenlight; Launch Trailer Features Music by Alfredo Sirica

1999 births
21st-century Italian composers
Italian film score composers
Italian music arrangers
Living people
Italian male film score composers
21st-century Italian male musicians